Live at the El Mocambo is a live video by Stevie Ray Vaughan and Double Trouble. The film was recorded at the El Mocambo club in Toronto, Ontario during the band's Texas Flood Tour. It was also released as a DVD on December 21, 1999, with interviews from drummer Chris Layton and bassist Tommy Shannon.

The performance was later released in 2014 on the album Stevie Ray Vaughan: The Complete Live Collection, with two bonus tracks, Howlin Wolf’s You’ll Be Mine, and Vaughan’s own Rude Mood.

Track listing
"Testify" (Isley Brothers) - 3:34
"So Excited" (S.R. Vaughan) - 4:05
"Voodoo Child (Slight Return)" (Jimi Hendrix) - 6:39
"Pride and Joy" (S.R. Vaughan) - 4:36 
"Tell Me" (Chester Arthur Burnett) - 3:08
"Mary Had a Little Lamb" (George 'Buddy' Guy) - 3:15
"Texas Flood" (Larry Davis / Joseph Wade Scott) - 9:30
"Love Struck Baby" (S.R. Vaughan) - 2:51
"Hug You, Squeeze You" (John Lee Hooker) - 3;44
"Third Stone from the Sun" (Jimi Hendrix) - 6:10
"Lenny" (S.R. Vaughan) - 8:36
"Wham" (Lonnie Mack) - 3:47

Certifications

References

Stevie Ray Vaughan video albums
1991 video albums
Live video albums
1991 live albums
Music of Toronto